Derek Joseph Fisher (born August 21, 1993) is an American professional baseball outfielder who is currently a free agent. He has played in Major League Baseball (MLB) for the Houston Astros, Toronto Blue Jays and Milwaukee Brewers. He attended the University of Virginia, where he played college baseball for the Virginia Cavaliers.

Amateur career
Fisher attended Cedar Crest High School in Lebanon, Pennsylvania. Playing for the school's baseball team, Fisher had a .440 batting average with nine home runs in his junior year, and was named to the all-state's first team. He also competed in national showcases. Baseball America ranked Fisher as the ninth-best high school prospect and best Pennsylvania prospect available in the 2011 Major League Baseball draft. As a senior, he batted .484 with 11 home runs and 28 runs batted in (RBIs), and was named the Gatorade Player of the Year for Pennsylvania. He was selected by the Texas Rangers in the sixth round of the draft, but did not sign. He enrolled at the University of Virginia to play college baseball for the Virginia Cavaliers baseball team.

As a freshman, Fisher batted .288 with seven home runs and 50 RBIs, and was named a Freshman All-American by Louisville Slugger and invited to participate in the College Home Run Derby. In 2013, he played collegiate summer baseball with the Harwich Mariners of the Cape Cod Baseball League, and was named a league all-star. Fisher was named a preseason All-American in 2014. In February 2014, he was named the Atlantic Coast Conference Player of the Week. On March 17, 2014, Fisher had surgery to remove a hamate bone from his right wrist, which caused him to miss 25 games of the 2014 season.

Professional career

Houston Astros
The Houston Astros selected Fisher with the 37th overall selection in the 2014 Major League Baseball draft. He signed with the Astros, receiving a $1,534,100 signing bonus, and began his professional career with the Tri-City ValleyCats of the Class A-Short Season New York–Penn League. He batted .303 in 41 games for Tri-City, and was assigned to the Quad Cities River Bandits of the Class A Midwest League to start the 2015 season. After he hit .305 with six home runs and 24 RBIs in 39 games, the Astros promoted Fisher to the Lancaster JetHawks of the Class A-Advanced California League. Fisher hit three home runs, including two grand slams, as he recorded a California League record 12 RBIs in his first game for Lancaster.

Fisher began the 2016 season with the Corpus Christi Hooks of the Class AA Texas League. After he batted .245 with 16 home runs, 23 stolen bases, and 59 RBIs in 371 at-bats for Corpus Christi, the Astros promoted Fisher to the Fresno Grizzlies of the Class AAA Pacific Coast League in August. The Astros invited Fisher to spring training as a non-roster player in 2017. He began the 2017 season with Fresno.

The Astros promoted Fisher to the major leagues on June 14, 2017.  In his first game, he collected his first two hits, the first being a home run.  In addition, the two hits came the same inning, making him the first player to do so since Adam LaRoche in 2004.  He ended the day 2-for-3, and added two walks. He collected his first career stolen base the following game at home against the Boston Red Sox. The Astros optioned Fisher to the minor leagues, and he was selected to appear in the All-Star Futures Game.

Fisher made the Astros' playoff roster, appearing primarily as a pinch runner.  On October 30, in a game that started on October 29, he scored the game winning run in Game 5 of the 2017 World Series. The World Series would go on for 7 games, as the Astros successfully plowed through, winning the series for the first time.

On March 24, 2018, the Astros announced that Fisher had made their 2018 Opening Day roster. He struggled offensively and was ultimately demoted to the AAA Fresno Grizzlies, hitting .165 with four home runs, eleven RBI's, and an OPS of .602 in 42 MLB games. In 2019, Fisher appeared in only 17 games with the Astros, hitting .226 with an OPS of .675, before being traded to the Toronto Blue Jays at the July 31 trade deadline.

Toronto Blue Jays
On July 31, 2019, the Astros traded Fisher to the Toronto Blue Jays in exchange for Aaron Sanchez, Joe Biagini, and Cal Stevenson. He hit .161 with 6 home runs in 40 games.

Overall with the 2020 Blue Jays, Fisher batted .226 with one home run and seven RBIs in 16 games. On February 11, 2021, Fisher was designated for assignment by the Blue Jays after the signing of David Phelps was made official.

Milwaukee Brewers
On February 15, 2021, the Blue Jays traded Fisher to the Milwaukee Brewers for a player to be named later and cash. Fisher went 2-for-8 in 4 games with Milwaukee before being designated for assignment on June 22. He was outrighted to the Triple-A Nashville Sounds on June 28.

Minnesota Twins
On December 16, 2021, Fisher signed a minor league contract with the Minnesota Twins. He was released on June 11, 2022.

References

External links

1993 births
Living people
American expatriate baseball players in Canada
Baseball players from Pennsylvania
Corpus Christi Hooks players
Fresno Grizzlies players
Gulf Coast Astros players
Harwich Mariners players
Houston Astros players
Lancaster JetHawks players
Major League Baseball outfielders
Milwaukee Brewers players
Nashville Sounds players
People from Lebanon, Pennsylvania
Quad Cities River Bandits players
Round Rock Express players
Toronto Blue Jays players
Tri-City ValleyCats players
Virginia Cavaliers baseball players
Madison Mallards players